Boyatt Wood is a small residential area and civil parish north-west of Eastleigh in Hampshire named locally after the wooded area to the south of Boyatt Lane which connects the area to the village of Otterbourne. On 1 April 2021 it became a civil parish.

St Peter's Church is an Anglican parish church in the area. Boyatt Wood Allotment Site contains 61 gardening plots.

A local secondary school, Crestwood Community School, was where Scott Mills was taught.

One amateur football team, the Boyatt Wood FC, has been based in the area since 2012.

National cycle network route 23 runs through Boyatt wood

References

Populated places in Hampshire
Civil parishes in Hampshire
Borough of Eastleigh
Populated places established in 2021